This is a page listing the results of the Auckland Vulcans in the New South Wales Cup Rugby League competition. The Vulcans were known as the Auckland Lions in 2007.

NSWRL Premier League

2007
Round 1 vs Parramatta Eels, won 27-8, Mt Smart Stadium
Round 2 vs Newtown Jets, lost 18-38, Mt Smart Stadium
Round 3 vs Canterbury Bulldogs, lost 28-32, Telstra Stadium
Round 4 vs Manly Sea Eagles, won 29-16, Brookvale Oval
Round 5 vs St George Illawarra Dragons, won 26-20, Mt Smart Stadium
Round 6 vs Bye
Round 7 vs North Sydney Bears, lost 10-46, North Sydney Oval
Round 8 vs Cronulla Sharks, lost 24-26, Mt Smart Stadium
Round 9 vs Newcastle Knights, lost 4-14, EnergyAustralia Stadium
Round 10 vs Balmain Ryde Eastwood Tigers, lost 18-28, Mt Smart Stadium
Round 11 vs Parramatta Eels, lost 22-30, Parramatta Stadium
Round 12 vs Canterbury Bulldogs, lost 16-36, Mt Smart Stadium
Round 13 vs Manly Sea Eagles, won 10-8, Mt Smart Stadium
Round 14 vs Cronulla Sharks, lost 16-34, Toyota Park
Round 15 vs Penrith Panthers, lost 14-36, Mt Smart Stadium
Round 16 vs Bye
Round 17 vs Balmain Ryde Eastwood Tigers, won 28-26, Leichhardt Oval
Round 18 vs St George Illawarra Dragons, lost 20-24, Mt Smart Stadium
Round 19 vs Western Suburbs Magpies, won 42-22, Campbelltown Sports Ground
Round 20 vs Newcastle Knights, won 54-26, Mt Smart Stadium
Round 21 vs Newtown Jets, won 19-16, Henson Park
Round 22 vs Canterbury Bulldogs, won 27-26, Mt Smart Stadium
Round 23 vs Canberra Raiders, lost 10-36, Canberra Stadium
Round 24 vs Bye
Round 25 vs Penrith Panthers, lost 16-38, CUA Stadium

New South Wales Cup

2008
Round 1 vs Central Coast Storm, lost 20–22, Henham Park (Auckland)
Round 2 vs Wentworthville Magpies, lost 10–34, Ringrose Park
Round 3 vs Central Newcastle Knights, won 44–18, Henham Park
Round 4 vs Newtown Jets, won 23–22, Henson Park
Round 5 vs Balmain Ryde Eastwood Tigers, lost 18–30, Leichhardt Oval
Round 6 vs Cronulla Cobras, won 33–30, Harold Moody Park (Auckland)
Round 7 vs Windsor Wolves, won 41–24, venue unknown, (Auckland)
Round 8 vs North Sydney Bears, lost 18-48, North Sydney Oval
Round 9 vs Manly Sea Eagles, lost 34-37, Brookvale Oval
Round 10 vs Western Suburbs Magpies, lost 16-46, Mt Smart #2
Round 11 vs Wentworthville Magpies, lost 16-34, Mt Smart #2
Round 12 vs Central Newcastle Knights, lost 4-52, venue unknown (Newcastle)
Round 13 vs Central Coast Storm, won 40-24, Morry Breen Oval
Round 14 vs Canterbury Bulldogs, won 40-26, Mt Smart #2
Round 15 vs North Sydney Bears, lost 16-54, Mt Smart #2
Round 16 vs Cronulla Cobras, lost 20-26, Toyota Park
Round 17 vs Newtown Jets, won 32-12, Mt Smart #2
Round 18 vs Windsor Wolves, won 24-18, Windsor Sports Complex
Round 19 vs Western Suburbs Magpies, lost 24-30, Campbelltown Sports Ground
Round 20 vs Balmain-Ryde Eastwood Tigers, lost 26-30, Mt Smart #2
Round 21 vs Canterbury Bulldogs, lost 16-46, Crest Stadium
Round 22 vs Manly Sea Eagles, won 34-26, Mt Smart #2

2009

Round 1 vs Balmain-Ryde Eastwood Tigers, lost 20-21, Western Springs Stadium (Auckland)
Round 2 vs Windsor Wolves, won 30-18, Windsor Sports Complex
Round 3 vs Central Coast Storm, draw 20-20, Henham Park
Round 4 vs Shellharbour Dragons, won 20-12, Ron Costello Oval
Round 5 vs Newtown Jets, lost 24-26, Walter Massey Park (Auckland)
Round 6 vs Bankstown City Bulldogs, lost 26-46, Terry Lamb Sports Complex
Round 7 vs North Sydney Bears, lost 12-36, North Sydney Oval
Round 8 vs Bye
Round 9 vs Balmain-Ryde Eastwood Tigers, lost 12-42, Leichhardt Oval
Round 10 vs Wentworthville Magpies, won 32-16, Mt Smart #2
Round 11 vs Cronulla Sharks, lost 16-38, Toyota Park
Round 12 vs Windsor Wolves, won 46-6, Mt Smart #2
Round 13 vs Bye
Round 14 vs Central Coast Storm, lost 6-50, Morry Breen Oval
Round 15 vs Western Suburbs Magpies, lost 20-30, Mt Smart #2
Round 16 vs Newtown Jets, lost 26-36, Henson Park
Round 17 vs North Sydney Bears, lost 8-28, Mt Smart #2
Round 18 vs Wentworthville Magpies, lost 0-58, Ringrose Park
Round 19 vs Cronulla Sharks, lost 22-38, Mt Smart #2
Round 20 vs Shellharbour Dragons, lost 20-44, Mt Smart #2
Round 21 vs Western Suburbs Magpies, lost 12-66, Campbelltown Sports Ground
Round 22 vs Bankstown City Bulls, lost 8-68, Henham Park

2010
Round 1 vs Cronulla Sharks, lost 18-36, Windsor Sports Complex
Round 2 vs Windsor Wolves, lost 28-46, Windsor Sports Complex
Round 3 vs Shellharbour Dragons, lost 18-48, Ron Costello Oval
Round 4 vs Balmain-Ryde Eastwood Tigers, won 38-14, Mt Smart #2
Round 5 vs Newtown Jets, lost 22-44, Henson Park
Round 6 vs Canterbury Bankstown Bulldogs, lost 28-40, Mt Smart #2
Round 7 vs Cronulla Sharks, won 38-34, Toyota Park
Round 8 vs Melbourne Storm, lost 22-24, Mt Smart #2
Round 9 vs Windsor Wolves, lost 24-44, Windsor Sports Complex
Round 10 vs North Sydney Bears, won 34-10, Mt Smart #2
Round 11 vs Shellharbour Dragons, won 41-18, Mt Smart #2
Round 12 vs Central Coast Centurions, won 37-24, Morry Breen Oval
Round 13 vs Wentworthville Magpies, won 34-22, Mt Smart #2
Round 14 vs Western Suburbs Magpies, lost 20-30, Campbelltown Sports Ground
Round 15 vs Windsor Wolves, lost 16-40, Mt Smart #2
Round 16 vs Balmain-Ryde Eastwood Tigers, lost 14-48, Leichhardt Oval
Round 17 vs Bye
Round 18 Canterbury Bulldogs, lost 0-54, Crest Stadium
Round 19 vs Central Coast Centurions, lost 16-38, Mt Smart #2
Round 20 vs Wentworthville Magpies, lost 24-32, Ringrose Park
Round 21 vs Cronulla Sharks, won 44-34, Mt Smart #2
Round 22 vs Shellharbour Dragons, lost 20-50, Ron Costello Oval
Round 23 vs Newtown Jets, lost 22-26, Mt  Smart Stadium
Round 24 vs Melbourne Storm, lost 24-34, Olympic Park Stadium
Round 25 vs Western Suburbs Magpies, lost 28-29, Mt Smart Stadium
Round 26 vs North Sydney Bears, won 32-28, North Sydney Oval

Auckland rugby league clubs